Juan Carlos Oyarzún (6 June 1951 – 11 December 2021) was an Argentine politician. As a member of the Fueguian People's Movement, he served in the Argentine Senate from 1992 to 1998.

References

1951 births
2021 deaths
20th-century Argentine politicians
Fueguino People's Movement politicians
Members of the Argentine Senate for Tierra del Fuego
People from Ushuaia